is the fourth single by Japanese music trio Candies. Written by Kazuya Senke and Yūsuke Hoguchi, the single was released on September 1, 1974. This was the last single in which Yoshiko Tanaka ("Sue") assumed the role of lead singer.

The song peaked at No. 40 on Oricon's singles chart and sold over 59,000 copies.

Track listing 
All lyrics are written by Kazuya Senke, except where indicated; all music is written and arranged by Yūsuke Hoguchi, except where indicated.

Chart positions

References

External links 
 
 

1974 singles
1974 songs
Japanese-language songs
Candies (group) songs
Sony Music Entertainment Japan singles